Gele is the name of one of the electoral wards in the town and community of Abergele, Conwy County Borough, Wales. It covers the southern part of the town and a more rural area to the southeast including the settlement of St George. It takes its name from the River Gele which runs through the western part of the ward.

As of 2016 the estimated ward population of the ward was about 4,600, with 22.7% able to speak Welsh.

County council elections
The ward elects three county councillors to Conwy County Borough Council and, at the May 2017 election, the seats were won by Independent councillor David Wood and Conservative Party councillors Mark Baker and Pauline Heap-Williams. It has been represented by a wide variety of political parties since 1995, including a Liberal Democrat (1995-2004) and a Plaid Cymru representative (2012–17).

In December, 2022 after Cllr Andrew Wood was re-elected to represent the ward, it was reported that he had broken the law by voting by operating his phone whilst driving, an opposition councillor described it as being "completely reckless".

2017

2012

* = sitting councillor prior to the election
[a] = elected as a Conservative at the 2008 election

Town Council
Gele is also a community ward to Abergele Town Council, electing six town councillors.

See also
 List of places in Conwy County Borough (categorised)

References

Abergele
Wards of Conwy County Borough